Earnest Preston "Tiny" Osborne (April 9, 1893 – January 5, 1969) was an American pitcher in Major League Baseball who played from 1922 to 1925 for the Chicago Cubs and  Brooklyn Robins. The native of Porterdale, Georgia, batted left-handed and threw right-handed.

In 142 big-league games pitched, including 74 starting assignments, and 646 innings, Osborne allowed 693 hits and 315 bases on balls. He registered two shutouts, 31 complete games, 263 strikeouts and seven saves.  His professional career began in 1919 and ended in 1935, but he was out of "organized baseball" during 1920 and from 1928–34.  His son, Bobo Osborne, was an MLB first baseman and third baseman between 1957 and 1963.

External links

1893 births
1969 deaths
Atlanta Crackers players
Augusta Dollies players
Baseball players from Georgia (U.S. state)
Brooklyn Robins players
Chicago Cubs players
Jackson Mississippians players
Major League Baseball pitchers
Nashville Vols players
New Orleans Pelicans (baseball) players